Probable E3 ubiquitin-protein ligase TRIP12 is an enzyme that in humans is encoded by the TRIP12 gene.

Interactions
TRIP12 has been shown to interact with APPBP1.

References

Further reading